Pfister is a German surname.

Etymology
"Pfister" comes from the Latin word for "baker": pistor, via the High German Consonant Shift that transformed the "p" into "pf". The name is found principally in those parts of ethnic Germany that were part of the Roman empire, while the native German word "Bäcker" is found elsewhere.

The etymology is evident in old towns throughout these parts where a "Pfisterngasse" (Baker Street) is commonly found, and still containing bakeries, such as Pfisterngasse in Solothurn.

People
Notable people with the surname include:

 Albrecht Pfister, one of the first European printers to use movable type
 Albrecht Pfister (mathematician), a German mathematician
 Charles F. Pfister, a wealthy tannery magnate, bank financier, utility owner, newspaper publisher, hotelier, and philanthropist
 Christian Pfister, a French historian
 Christian Pfister (Swiss historian)
 Daniel Pfister
 George Pfister
 Hank Pfister, American tennis player
 Hanspeter Pfister
 Manuel Pfister
 Marcus Pfister, Swiss author, illustrator
 Nadia Pfister (born 1995), Swiss squash player
 Oskar Pfister
 Otto Pfister
 Otto Pfister (naturalist)
 Phil Pfister, strongman
 Wally Pfister, Academy Award winning cinematographer and director

Related names 
 The "Feaster" surname was adopted by some Pfisters that immigrated to the United States. Pister was also used as misspelling of Pfister by German immigrants coming to the United States.

See also 

 Pfister (firm), a manufacturer of faucets (UK: taps) and other accessories
 The Pfister Hotel
 Feaster (surname)
 Pfitzer (surname)
 
 Fister (disambiguation)

German-language surnames
Occupational surnames
American families of German ancestry